Patricio Rudi (born 16 December 1977) is a retired Argentine professional tennis player. He had a career-high ATP singles ranking of world No. 367 achieved on 19 February 2001, and a career-high ATP doubles ranking of world No. 212 achieved on 22 April 2002. He never successfully qualified for an ATP Tour main draw match, thus playing exclusively on the ATP Challenger Tour and ITF Futures Tour.

Rudi reached 3 career singles finals, posting a tally of 3 wins and 0 losses, all coming on the ITF Futures Tour. Additionally, he reached 27 career doubles finals with a record of 18 wins and 9 losses including a 1–2 record in ATP Challenger Tour finals. He won the 2003 Weiden ATP Challenger tournament held on clay courts in Germany alongside compatriot Mariano Delfino defeating Diego del Rio and Tomas Tenconi by a score of 6–2, 4–6, 7–6(8–6).

ATP Challenger and ITF Futures finals

Singles: 3 (3–0)

Doubles: 27 (18–9)

References

External links
 
 

1977 births
Living people
Argentine male tennis players
21st-century Argentine people